

The Latécoère 26 was a French monoplane mail plane designed and built by Latécoère.

Development
The Latécoère 26 was designed in the 1920s as a mail carrier, based on the earlier Latécoère 25 with a longer fuselage, and first flew in 1926. It had a parasol wing with a fixed tailskid landing gear. The main landing gear was both robust and wide-track, to enable the aircraft to land on unprepared surfaces. It was powered by a single nose-mounted Renault 12Ja piston engine, and had room for only two passengers and an open cockpit for the pilot.

Operational history
Most of the aircraft were operated by Aéropostale on North and West African mail routes; two aircraft were sold in Argentina.

Variants
Laté 26
Initial production variant.
Laté 26-2-R
Introduced in 1927 it had a radio compartment.
Laté 26-3
Added fuel tank in wing centre-section.
Laté 26-3-R
With a balanced rudder.
Laté 26-6
Added a co-pilots cockpit in tandem behind the pilot, different landing gear and increased fuel capacity.
Laté 26-6/2
Re-engined with a 500hp (373kW) Renault engine and reduced wing area and tail surfaces.

Operators

Aéropostale

Specifications (26-2-R)

See also

References

 
 
 
 
 

2
1920s French mailplanes
Single-engined tractor aircraft
Parasol-wing aircraft
Aircraft first flown in 1926